Frenelles-en-Vexin is a commune in the Eure department in Normandy in northern France. It was established on 1 January 2019 by merger of the former communes of Boisemont (the seat), Corny and Fresne-l'Archevêque.

See also
Communes of the Eure department

References

Communes of Eure